David Mandel (born ) is a writer, actor, director, and producer. He was an executive producer and showrunner of Veep, and also an executive producer and director of Curb Your Enthusiasm and Seinfeld. He is also a comedian, and one of the producer-directors of the teen-comedy EuroTrip. He was a writer for Seinfeld during its seventh, eighth, and ninth seasons and also co-wrote the screenplay for the 2003 film adaptation of The Cat in the Hat. He is one of the creators of Clerks: The Animated Series, and he was a writer for Saturday Night Live. He had a brief stint as a host of Dave and Steve's Video Game Explosion, a comedy video game review show that aired late nights on TBS as part of the Burly Bear Network. The show only lasted a few episodes before the entire block was canceled.

Mandel is also one of the authors of Star Wars Art: Ralph McQuarrie, a comprehensive collection of Star Wars artwork by Ralph McQuarrie, published in 2016 by Abrams Books.

Since October 2020, Mandel has hosted the podcast The Stuff Dreams Are Made Of detailing movie props and collectables with writer Ryan Condel.

He is Jewish.

Filmography

Seinfeld-related credits
Mandel wrote the Seinfeld episode "The Bizarro Jerry", and on the commentary track to the DVD, has stated that this was his favorite Seinfeld of the episodes he wrote.

Writer
 "The Pool Guy"
 "The Friar's Club"
 "The Bizarro Jerry"
 "The Abstinence"
 "The Susie"
 "The Butter Shave"
 "The Voice"
 "The Betrayal"
 "The Maid"
 "The Puerto Rican Day"

References

External links

American television writers
American male television writers
Jewish American writers
The Harvard Lampoon alumni
Living people
21st-century American Jews
Place of birth missing (living people)
Year of birth missing (living people)